Five Little Peppers at Home is a 1940 American drama black and white film. It is the second Five Little Peppers film.

Cast
Edith Fellows as Polly Pepper
Charles Peck as Ben Pepper
Tommy Bond as Joey Pepper
Bobby Larson as Davie Pepper
Dorothy Anne Seese as Phronsie Pepper
Clarence Kolb as Mr. King
Ronald Sinclair as Jasper
Rex Evans as Martin
Herbert Rawlinson as Mr. Decker
Laura Treadwell as Aunt Martha

External links

1940 films
American drama films
1940 drama films
Columbia Pictures films
Films directed by Charles Barton
American black-and-white films
1940s English-language films
1940s American films